Collepardo is a comune (municipality) in the Province of Frosinone in the Italian region Lazio, located about  east of Rome and about  north of Frosinone.

History
The presence of ancient polygonal walls ("Pelasgic Walls") testifies the human presence in the area since ancient times, although the current settlement was likely founded in the 6th century CE during the reign of Theodoric the Great. Collepardo belonged to the Colonna family after the reign of pope Martin V (1422).

Main sights 

 Collepardo Caves, a group of karst caves
 Pozzo d'Antullo, a sinkhole in the Monti Ernici
 Giardino Botanico di Collepardo
 Certosa di Trisulti, a national monument

References

External links
 Official website

Cities and towns in Lazio